Monkey fruit is a common name for several plants and can refer to some species in the following genera:

Artocarpus, particularly Artocarpus lacucha and Artocarpus rigidus
Garcinia, particularly Garcinia intermedia
Limonia
Myrianthus

References